The 2019 Saudari Cup was contested between the women's national teams of Singapore and Malaysia from 28 to 30 August 2019.

The Saudari Cup is an annual event between the two sides, which started in 2014, with Malaysia winning all of the previous editions, including the most recent edition in 2018. The series consisted of three Women's Twenty20 International (WT20I) matches, all being played at the Indian Association Ground in Singapore. Malaysia retained the title, sweeping the series 3–0.

This was the second edition of the event to have WT20I status following the International Cricket Council's decision to grant T20I status to all matches played between women's sides of Associate Members after 1 July 2018.

Squads

T20I series

1st WT20I

2nd WT20I

3rd WT20I

References

External links
 Series home at ESPN Cricinfo

Associate international cricket competitions in 2019
International cricket competitions in Singapore
Saudari Cup